The Presidential Communications Group, or simply the Communications Group, is the collective name for the offices within the Office of the President of the Philippines and refers to the position of the Secretary of Presidential Communications Office formerly known as Office of the Press Secretary and the Secretary of the Presidential Communications Operations Office (PCOO). The office of the presidential spokesperson was previously under the Communications Group.

The Communications Group is primarily responsible for planning, programming, and coordinating the activities that will most effectively collect information about what is happening in the Executive branch of the government, and getting this information to the media. The Group's other role is to help Filipinos understand government policies and programs, and to shore up support for them.

Presidential Spokesperson

The Presidential Spokesperson spoke on behalf of the President about matters of public interest. Considering the restricted level of access that the media has to the Chief Executive, the Spokesperson was expected to be the primary source of presidential directives in the absence of the President of the Philippines.

The Presidential Spokesperson was not subject to confirmation by the Commission on Appointments, and did not have any specific item or template in government.

The position was last occupied by the Secretary of the Presidential Communications Operations Office Martin Andanar in an acting capacity due to the resignation of Harry Roque, while the Assistant to the Presidential Spokesperson was Atty. Kris Roman of the Duterte administration. During the administration of President Bongbong Marcos, the office was abolished and all its personnel, equipment and functions were transferred to the office of the Press Secretary then headed by Trixie Cruz-Angeles.

On December 2022, Daphne Oseña-Paez was appointed as the Presidential Communications Office Press Briefer, a position created only for briefings for the Malacañang Press Corps in the New Executive Building. All press conferences that includes President Bongbong Marcos is personally moderated a by the PCO Secretary.

Presidential Communications Office

The Presidential Communications Office (PCO) is in charge of disseminating the government’s message to private media entities. It exercises supervision and control over state-owned media entities to disseminate the official messages properly and effectively in accordance with the communications plan. It is responsible for the accreditation and authentication of the credentials of foreign media correspondents in line with its primary task to cultivate relations and assist private media entities. During the administrations of Benigno Aquino III and Rodrigo Duterte, the office was named the Presidential Communications Operations Office (PCOO).

The PCO Secretary holds a cabinet rank. He/she is assisted by an undersecretary for administration, finance and procurement; an undersecretary for operations, plans, and policies; an undersecretary for legal affairs; an undersecretary for media accreditation and relations; one undersecretary each for digital media, print media, and broadcast media services; an undersecretary for special concerns; an assistant secretary; and an electronic data processing division chief.

The PCO is composed of the following units and agencies:

 APO Production Unit
 Bureau of Communications Services
 Freedom of Information-Program Management Office 
 Intercontinental Broadcasting Corporation
 National Printing Office
 People's Television Network
 Philippine Broadcasting Service - Bureau of Broadcast Services (Radyo Pilipinas)
 Philippine Information Agency
 Philippines News Agency - News and Information Bureau
 Presidential Broadcast Staff-Radio Television Malacañang

Powers and Functions
Pursuant to Section 3 of the Executive Order No. 2, s. 2022, the Office of the Press Secretary shall perform the following functions:
Pronounce on behalf of the President the matters pertaining to his/her actions, policies, programs, official activities, and accomplishments.
Develop and implement necessary guidelines and mechanisms pertaining to the delivery and dissemination of information on policies, programs, official activities, and achievements of the President and the Executive Branch.
Coordinate the crafting, formulation, development, and enhancement of the messaging system under the Office of the President and the Executive Branch.
Supervise and Coordinate with the agencies and Government-Owned and Controlled Corporations (GOCC)'s attached to the Office of the Press Secretary for purposes of further strengthening the system of information delivery to the public.
Established and Maintain rapport with private media and other similar entities and stakeholders; and
Perform such other functions as the Office of the President may assign from time to time.

Organization
The Office of the Press Secretary shall be organized as follows pursuant to Section 2 of the Executive Order No. 2, s. 2022:

(a) Office of the Secretary. The Office of the Secretary shall have an Assistant Secretary with support staff not more than twenty (20) personnel to be designated by the Press Secretary and approved by the Executive Secretary in the exigency of the service and in accordance with the civil service law and rules.

(b) Undersecretaries and Assistant Secretaries. In addition of the foregoing, there shall be Undersecretaries for the following areas. Each of which shall have Assistant Secretaries and Support Staff:

(I) Operations, Plans and Policies

(II) Administration, Finance and Procurement

(III) Legal Affairs

(IV) Media Accreditation and Relations

(V) Digital Media Services

(VI) Print Media Services and related Government-Owned and Controlled Corporations (GOCC)'s and attached agencies

(VII) Broadcast Media Services and related Government-Owned and Controlled Corporations (GOCC)'s and attached agencies; and

(VIII) Special Concerns

Key Officials
List of Key Officials as of January 10, 2023:
Atty. Cheloy Velicaria-Garafil, Secretary

Undersecretaries and Assistant Secretaries:
Greggy N. Eugenio - Undersecretary for Media Accreditation and Relations
Emerald R. Ridao - Undersecretary for Digital Media Services
Maria A. Pedroche - Undersecretary for Administration, Finance, & Procurement
Edwin M. Cordevilla - Undersecretary for Print Media Services and related GOCC's and attached agencies
Marlon B. Purificacion - Undersecretary for Special Concerns
Rowena "Ina" M. Reformina - Undersecretary for Broadcast Media Services and related GOCC's and attached agencies
Atty. Eugene Henry C. Rodriguez - Undersecretary for Operations, Plans, and Policies
Robert R. Ricohermoso - Assistant Secretary for Print Media Services and related GOCCs and attached agencies
Michel Andre P. Del Rosario - Assistant Secretary for Special Concerns and International Media Affairs
Antonio B. Narra, Jr. - Assistant Secretary for Finance
Jocelyn L. Siddayao - Assistant Secretary for Procurement
Dale Q. De Vera - Assistant Secretary for Media Accreditation and Relations
Patricia Kayle S. Martin - Assistant Secretary for Digital Media & Communications
Mardielyn D. Perez - Assistant Secretary for Digital Asset Management
Daphne O. Paez - Malacañang Press Briefer

Bureau and Service Directors:
Atty. Glenn Albert M. Ocampo - Director V, Director for Administration
Atty. Ansherina Paula C. Francisco - Director III, Director for Special Concerns
Mary Grace R. Baesa - Director III, Director for Finance
Jamille Mari S. Gonzales - Director III, Director for Procurement
Atty. Mark Wayne Eubank - Director III, Director for Organizational Development
Atty. Marlon M. Caisip - Director III, Director for Operations, Plans, and Policies
Mary Berlyn T. Reontare - Director III, Director for Digital Asset Management
Gaile G. Cardeño - Director III, Director for Digital Asset Management
Angelica R. Danlag - Director I, Director for Treasury

Division Chiefs:
Ma. Alma A. Francisco - Budget Division
Ma. Teresa L. Ubas - Accounting Division
Atty. Tara Triztina C. Rama - General Services Division
Rochelle I. Rubenecia - Human Resource Development Division
Jayson C. Erquiza - Procurement Division
Atty. Dictador V. Untayao - Legal Division

Attached Agency, Bureau and Office Heads
Rizal Giovanni P. Aportadera, Jr. - Director IV, Bureau of Broadcast Services (BBS)
Carlos A. Bathan - Director IV, National Printing Office (NPO)
Raymond Robert C. Burgos - Director III, News and Information Bureau (NIB)
Julio O. Castillo, Jr. - General Manager, People's Television Network, Inc. (PTV 4)
Hexilon Josephat Thaddeus G. Alvarez -  President and CEO, Intercontinental Broadcasting Corporation (IBC 13)
Vincent Steve P. Badong - Chairman & President, APO Production Unit, Inc.

Units under the Presidential Communications Office
With the reorganization of the PCOO under President Bongbong Marcos, most units previously under the agency were transferred to the Presidential Communications Office.

Presidential News Desk
The Presidential News Desk (PND) functions as the newsroom of Malacañang Palace. It gathers and disseminates information, such as press and photograph releases, and official statements from the Palace, on a daily basis.

The PND operates from Sundays to Saturdays, 5:00 AM to 7:00 PM.  It is headed by a chief editor and is composed of a managing editor, deskmen, and reporters. Other units, which support the PND are Electronic Data Processing, Transcription and Monitoring, and Photographs.

Francisco Tatad conceived the PND. He was the Press Secretary to President Ferdinand Marcos. It was then called the Central Desk and was located in the Mabini Building. During the administration of President Corazon C. Aquino, Press Secretary Benigno Teodoro relegated the Central Desk, which became the News and Reportorial Section, as a section of the Presidential Press Staff. Under the Ramos administration, Press Secretary Rodolfo Reyes strengthened presidential coverage and set up the PND.

Philippine Information Agency

The Philippine Information Agency (PIA), established by Executive Order No. 100, is the main development communication arm of the government.

The PIA directly serves the Presidency and the executive branch of the national, regional and provincial levels through its 16 regional offices and 71 provincial information centers. Its core services include: information gathering/research, production and dissemination, and institutional development and capacity-building focusing on alliance-building, networking, communication-related training, consultancy and technical assistance. The PIA is also the advertising arm of the government.

It is headed by a director general with a rank of undersecretary and four deputy director generals, four assistant director generals, staff directors in the central office, regional directors in the regional offices, and more than 500 permanent and contractual employees. It works closely with other government agencies, in particular the National Printing Office in the production of information materials.

Its tagline is "Empowering Communities". The PIA works with community stakeholders, including local government units, line agencies, private entities, schools, colleges and universities, civil society organizations, and other groups in ensuring proper dissemination of information at the grassroots level. The agency advocates responsible sharing of information and responsible use of social media. Its current management and personnel work with the mantra and belief that "a well-informed Filipino is an empowered Filipino".

Currently, the PIA is under the direct supervision of the Office of the President and absorbed offices previously under the PCOO, namely the Bureau of Communications Services, the Freedom of Information – Project Management Office, and the Good Governance Office.

Bureau of Communications Services 
The Bureau of Communications Services was an attached agency of the PCOO that is tasked to provide materials and services related to various functions of the Presidency, PCOO and the general public. It also owns Balita Central, a tabloid newspaper which is published bi-monthly through its official website and at selected LRT Line 2 stations. It also produces information materials for state events such as the anniversary of the People Power Revolution, Araw ng Kalayaan celebrations, and others.

It is currently absorbed by the Philippine Information Agency as ordered by Bongbong Marcos's Executive Order No. 2 s. 2022.

Presidential Broadcast Staff - Radio Television Malacañang

Created by President Corazon C. Aquino under Executive Order No. 297 on July 25, 1987, the Presidential Broadcast Staff - Radio Television Malacañang is tasked to provide the necessary media services, video and audio, to the incumbent President, to document all official engagements, and to make available to the public accurate and relevant information on the activities, programs and pronouncements of the national leadership.

The agency is involved in television coverage and documentation, news and public affairs syndication of all the activities of the President, either live or delayed telecast through government or private collaborating networks.

Since February 13, 2023, the agency is under the control and supervision of the PCO in accordance with Bongbong Marcos' Executive Order No. 16 s. 2023. The agency was under the Presidential Management Staff.

Media networks
There are two government-run television networks, namely the People's Television Network (PTV-4), and the Intercontinental Broadcasting Corporation (IBC-13). The Philippine Broadcasting Service (PBS) constitutes the government radio network. OPS still holds 20% minority stake in the Radio Philippines Network (RPN-9).

IBC-13 and RPN-9 were sequestered by the Presidential Commission on Good Government after the fall of the Marcos dictatorship. However, plans are being made to privatize IBC-13 and RPN-9 within two years to raise money. According to the 2009 report of the Presidential Commission on Good Government (PCGG), IBC-13 is valued at PHP 3.074 billion while RPN-9 is valued at PHP 1.3 billion.

National Printing Office

The National Printing Office (NPO) was established by Executive Order No. 285 on July 25, 1987.  Executive Order No. 285 abolished the General Services Administration and transferred its functions to other agencies. Its Government Printing Offices were merged with the printing units of the PIA. The NPO is mandated by Executive Order No. 285 to print forms, official ballots, public documents, and public information materials.

News and Information Bureau
The News and Information Bureau's main aim is to provide services relating to the development and formulation of a domestic and foreign information program for the Government in general, and the Presidency in particular, including the development of strategies for the dissemination of information on specific government programs. It is composed of the following divisions:
Finance and Administrative Division
Presidential Press Staff
Media Accreditation and Relations Division/International Press Center
Philippine News Agency

OP Web Development Office
The OP Web Development Office, commonly referred to as the President's New Media Team, is responsible for the establishment and management of the President's Official Website and Official Presence on social networking channels such as Facebook, Twitter, and YouTube. It is also partly responsible for the feedback mechanism of the President wherein it receives the comments, concerns and suggestions through the Contact Us section of the President's website. It is also responsible for the President's Social Media engagement and in maximizing the use of new technologies to further the President's agenda, policies and programs.

Presidential Communications Development and Strategic Planning Office

The Presidential Communications Development and Strategic Planning Office (PCDSPO) ensures that all aspects of communications are covered, to ensure that the administration’s message has been delivered successfully. This includes market research and polling. It devises the communications strategy to promote the President’s agenda throughout all media, and among the many people with whom the administration interacts. This can include, but is not limited to, the State of the Nation address, televised press conferences, statements to the press, and radio addresses. This office also works closely with cabinet-level departments and other executive agencies, in order to create a coherent strategy through which the president’s message can be disseminated.

During the administration of former president Benigno Aquino III, the PCDSPO head held a cabinet rank. The head was supported by a deputy of undersecretary rank, a chief of staff, an assistant secretary for messaging, and an electronic data processing division chief. After Rodrigo Duterte became the President in 2016, the PCDSPO was merged with the PCOO, thus effectively abolishing the PCDSPO. The PCOO was renamed as the Presidential Communications Office before it was reverted to Presidential Communications Operations Office.

Prior to June 30, 2016, the PCDSPO was composed of the following units and agencies, all of which were under the PCOO:
 Presidential Message Staff
 The OP Correspondence Office (previously placed under the Office of the Communications Director from the Presidential Management Staff per E.O. No. 348, August 11, 2004
 Media Research and Development Staff created by E.O. No. 297, July 25, 1987, from the Office of the Press Secretary
 The Presidential Museum and Library
 The Official Gazette
 The Speech Writers Group (previously placed under the Office of the Communications Director from the Presidential Management Staff per E.O. No. 348, August 11, 2004

Controversies
During the Duterte administration, the PCOO has been criticized for various errors and lapses committed by the office, including what one lawmaker called a "revisionist attempt to whitewash the dark years of martial law". The Secretary of the PCOO assured Congress that it will not repeat the office's mistakes.

In March 2018, the News and Information Bureau released a transcript to reporters of an interview erroneously attributed to the President of the Philippines which was in fact an interview with an impersonator.

In their 2020 annual report, the Commission on Audit flagged the PCOO for the mass hiring of employees under contract service worth PH₱70.6 million. Speculation cited that they're hiring them as "online trolls" to attack critics of the government, in which the state media agency denied the claim.

Notes

References

External links
 About the PCOO
 PCOO Directory
 Executive Order No. 4 Creating the Communications Group
 Briefer on Executive Order No. 4

 
Information ministries
Office of the President of the Philippines
Public relations in the Philippines